Stryszawa  is a village, the seat of the administrative district of Gmina Stryszawa, within Sucha County, Lesser Poland Voivodeship, in southern Poland.

The village has a population of 5,100.

The village was established in the second half of the 15th century by Słupski family, the owners of Sucha, and was first mentioned in 1480.

References

Stryszawa